The universal parabolic constant is a mathematical constant.

It is defined as the ratio, for any parabola, of the arc length of the parabolic segment formed by the latus rectum to the focal parameter. The focal parameter is twice the focal length. The ratio is denoted P.
In the diagram, the latus rectum is pictured in blue, the parabolic segment that it forms in red and the focal parameter in green. (The focus of the parabola is the point F and the directrix is the line L.)

The value of P is

 

. The circle and parabola are unique among conic sections in that they have a universal constant. The analogous ratios for ellipses and hyperbolas depend on their eccentricities. This means that all circles are similar and all parabolas are similar, whereas ellipses and hyperbolas are not.

Derivation
Take  as the equation of the parabola.

Properties
P is a transcendental number.
Proof. Suppose that P is algebraic. Then  must also be algebraic. However, by the Lindemann–Weierstrass theorem,  would be transcendental, which is not the case. Hence P is transcendental.

Since P is transcendental, it is also irrational.

Applications
The average distance from a point randomly selected in the unit square to its center is

Proof.

References and footnotes

Mathematical constants
Conic sections
Parabolas
Real transcendental numbers